Simcoe is an unincorporated community in Cullman County, Alabama, United States, located on Alabama State Route 69,  southwest of Fairview.

History
Simcoe is named for Lake Simcoe, a lake in Ontario. A post office operated under the name Simcoe from 1884 to 1903.

References

Unincorporated communities in Cullman County, Alabama
Unincorporated communities in Alabama